"What's past is prologue" is a quotation from the 1611 play The Tempest by William Shakespeare.

What's Past Is Prologue may also refer to:

 "What's Past Is Prologue" (The Flash), a 2018 episode
 "What's Past Is Prologue", a 2005 episode of the TV series Summerland
 "What's Past Is Prologue" (Star Trek: Discovery), a 2018 episode
 "What's Past Is Prologue", a 2019 episode of the Indian web series Bard of Blood

See also
 Past Is Prologue (disambiguation)